Bolshaya Glushitsa is the name of several rural localities in Russia:
Bolshaya Glushitsa, Samara Oblast, a selo in Bolsheglushitsky District of Samara Oblast
Bolshaya Glushitsa, Volgograd Oblast, a khutor in Yeterevsky Selsoviet of Mikhaylovsky District of Volgograd Oblast